The Occitan Party is a regionalist political party in France. Its aims include greater autonomy for the Occitania region of southern France. The Occitan Party was formed in Toulouse in 1987 through the union of different Occitanist movements ( etc.), of candidates to the 1986 regional elections and of various individuals.

The party's aims are:
 To set up a credible Occitanist political movement, independent of all other parties and struggling for Occitan self-government.
 To dis-alienate and raise the consciousness of the Occitan people.
 To make the Occitan question come out in the political field.

Electoral and political action
Since 1987, the Occitan Party has contested elections at all levels in different constituencies. In the 1997 parliamentary elections, the POC's best candidates polled 1.8% of the vote. Party members hold office in a few townships, including Saint-Hostien.

The Occitan Party takes part in economical or regional development struggles. Its members are active in struggles for the keeping of local jobs, against wholesale tourist commercialization, against the nuclear power industry, and for the preservation of Occitania's natural environment. They also take part in the defence of the Occitan language and identity.

The Party's paper, Occitània, comes out every two months.

International relationships
The Occitan Party belongs to the Fédération Régions et Peuples Solidaires federation which brings together different regionalist and nationalist political movements in the French state. The Occitan Party also belongs to the European Free Alliance.

Internal organisation
Local or departmental committees are grouped in regional federations. The National Council brings together delegates from the different regional federations (the party's parliament). The National Bureau is elected every two years by a Congress that is open to every party member.

References

External links
 Occitània - VVAP, BP 28, F- 81370 St Sulpici La Punta, the revue of the party (every two months).
 
 Comity of Toulouse (Haute-Garonne) area of the Partit Occitan
 Comity of Montpellier (Herault) area of the Partit Occitan
 Regional Section Provence (Var) of the Partit Occitan
 Regional Section Provence (Bouches du Rhones and Vaucluse) of the Partit Occitan
 Comity of Albi area (Tarn) of the Partit Occitan
 Section Cantal of the Partit Occitan

Occitan language
Social democratic parties in France
Political parties of minorities
European Free Alliance
Occitan nationalism
Left-wing nationalist parties
Political parties established in 1987
1987 establishments in France